Lito Fata (born 21 September 1974) is a former Australian rugby union player. She competed for Australia at the 2006 Rugby World Cup in Canada. She made only two appearances for the Wallaroos, both against the United States at the 2006 tournament.

References 

1974 births
Living people
Australian female rugby union players
Australia women's international rugby union players
People from Kawakawa, New Zealand
People educated at Bay of Islands College